Neopomacentrus cyanomos, commonly known as the regal demoiselle, is a fish native to the Indo-Pacific region from the Persian Gulf, the Red Sea and the coastal waters of  east Africa east to the Philippines, north to southern Japan, south to northern Australia and Melanesia. It has also been found as an invasive species in the Gulf of Mexico, off the Yucatan Peninsula, although how they arrived there is unknown.

References

External links
 

Fish of Thailand
Taxa named by Pieter Bleeker
Fish described in 1856
Fish of the Indian Ocean
cyanomos